Sail Away is an American reality television series which follows ten teenagers sailing aboard the Simpatico off the Bahamas with assistance from their leader Nicolas Popov and Dragan Popov. There are no plans for a second series. The series was produced by Discovery Kids. The first series was filmed in 2000, aired in early 2001 and consisted of 13 episodes.

Overview 
The series follows ten (13-15 year olds) teenagers as they sail a ship called the Simpatico just off the Bahamas. They are assisted by professional sailors Nicolas Popov and Dragan Popov. They have to learn to live in confined spaces, learn new skills and accept the differences between people. Each day they participate in challenges such as diving with sharks, exploring sunken wrecks and swimming with wild dolphins.

Participants

Series 1
Calvin White
Carlos Farias
Zach Fentress
Petra Harvey
Alex Julius
Aubrey Parsley
Charlotte Ronveaux
Geo Seery
Whitney Berry
Elie Haswell

Episodes

Series 1: 2001

International Broadcasts

Simmilair Productions 
Survive This 
Serious Ocean

References 

2001 American television series debuts
2001 American television series endings
2000s American reality television series
2000s American teen television series
American educational television series
Discovery Kids original programming
English-language television shows
Television series about teenagers